Olivet is an unincorporated community located in the towns of Gilman and Spring Lake, Pierce County, Wisconsin, United States.

References

Unincorporated communities in Pierce County, Wisconsin
Unincorporated communities in Wisconsin